Wes Avi Littleton (born September 2, 1982) is an American former professional baseball relief pitcher who spent his entire three-year playing career in Major League Baseball (MLB) with the Texas Rangers (2006–2008). He is noted for being credited with a save after pitching the final three scoreless innings in a 30–3 victory over the Baltimore Orioles in the first game of a two-night doubleheader at Camden Yards on August 22, 2007. The final 27-run differential broke the previous MLB record of 19 for largest winning margin for a save. The New York Times noted that "there are the preposterous saves, of which Littleton's now stands out as No. 1."

Career
A sidearm pitcher, he made his major league debut in the ninth inning of a 3–2 loss to the Toronto Blue Jays at Ameriquest Field in Arlington on July 4, 2006. He faced two batters, retiring Vernon Wells on a groundout to the third baseman and Troy Glaus on a called third strike. Littleton failed to make the Rangers' big league roster to start the 2007 season, and was optioned to the Triple-A Oklahoma RedHawks, but was later called up to play for Texas.

On November 28, 2008, Littleton was traded to the Boston Red Sox in exchange for a player to be named later, minor league pitcher Beau Vaughan. On March 17, 2009, Littleton was claimed off waivers by the Milwaukee Brewers.

Littleton signed a minor league contract on March 1, 2010, with the Seattle Mariners. He spent the 2012 season with the Amarillo Sox of the American Association of Independent Professional Baseball before retiring.

Personal life
Littleton has African American and Samoan heritage. He worked as a DJ during the offseason.

References

External links

1982 births
Living people
Sportspeople from Hayward, California
Baseball players from California
African-American baseball players
American sportspeople of Samoan descent
Major League Baseball pitchers
Texas Rangers players
Cal State Fullerton Titans baseball players
Spokane Indians players
Stockton Ports players
Frisco RoughRiders players
Oklahoma RedHawks players
Huntsville Stars players
Nashville Sounds players
West Tennessee Diamond Jaxx players
Tacoma Rainiers players
High Desert Mavericks players
Amarillo Thunderheads players
Peoria Saguaros players
Surprise Rafters players